In enzymology, a 1,5-anhydro-D-fructose reductase is an enzyme that catalyzes the chemical reaction

1,5-anhydro-D-glucitol + NADP  1,5-anhydro-D-fructose + NADPH + H

Thus, the two substrates of this enzyme are 1,5-anhydro-D-glucitol and NADP, whereas its 3 products are 1,5-anhydro-D-fructose, NADPH, and H.

This enzyme belongs to the family of oxidoreductases, specifically those acting on the CH-OH group of donor with NAD or NADP as acceptor. The systematic name of this enzyme class is 1,5-anhydro-D-glucitol:NADP oxidoreductase.

Structural studies

As of late 2007, only one structure has been solved for this class of enzymes, with the PDB accession code .

References 

 

EC 1.1.1
NADPH-dependent enzymes
Enzymes of known structure